Basic programming may refer to:

Basic television programming, the set of channels included in basic subscription to satellite or cable television.
Programming in one of the BASIC programming languages.
BASIC Programming, cartridge for the Atari 2600 console, released in 1979.